Hashmatullah Shahidi (born 4 November 1994) is an Afghan cricketer and currently the captain of Afghanistan national cricket team in One Day International and Test cricket. He made his One Day International (ODI) debut for Afghanistan against Kenya in October 2013. He was one of the eleven cricketers to play in Afghanistan's first ever Test match, against India, in June 2018.  He became the first Afghan player to score a test double hundred when he scored 200 not out against Zimbabwe in on 11 March 2021. In May 2021.

Career
In the final of the 2017–18 Ahmad Shah Abdali 4-day Tournament, batting for Band-e-Amir Region against Speen Ghar Region, he scored 163 runs in the first innings. Scored his first international six In ODI series against Ireland in Ireland on 21/May/2019 scoring his 865* Runs without a six in ODI.

In May 2018, he was named in Afghanistan's squad for their inaugural Test match, played against India. He made his Test debut for Afghanistan, against India, on 14 June 2018. He top scored in the second innings of the match with an unbeaten 36 albeit in a losing cause. In February 2019, he was named in Afghanistan's Test squad for their one-off match against Ireland in India.

On 11 March 2021 he became the first Afghan player to score a test double hundred when he scored 200 not out in Afghanistan's first innings total of 545 for 4 declared in the Test against Zimbabwe.

In April 2019, he was named in Afghanistan's squad for the 2019 Cricket World Cup. On 18 June 2019, in the match against England, Hashmatullah scored his 1,000th run in ODIs.

In September 2021, he was named in Afghanistan's squad for the 2021 ICC Men's T20 World Cup.

References

External links
 

1994 births
Afghan cricketers
Afghanistan Test cricketers
Afghanistan One Day International cricketers
Afghanistan Twenty20 International cricketers
Living people
People from Logar Province
Band-e-Amir Dragons cricketers
Spin Ghar Tigers cricketers
Nangarhar Leopards cricketers
Cricketers at the 2019 Cricket World Cup